Arnold 'Pico' Schütz (19 January 1935 – 14 April 2015) was a German footballer who played as a midfielder or defender. He spent nine seasons in the Bundesliga (253 appearances, 69 goals) with Werder Bremen, winning the championship in the 1964–65 season, having already played for the club for eight years in the Oberliga Nord under the previous regionalised system.

Honours
Werder Bremen
 Bundesliga: 1964–65; runner-up 1967–68
 DFB-Pokal: 1960–61

See also
 List of one-club men in association football

References

External links
 

1935 births
2015 deaths
German footballers
Footballers from Bremen
Association football midfielders
Bundesliga players
SV Werder Bremen players